Harry M. Koons (August 18, 1862 – April 5, 1932) was a third baseman in Major League Baseball. He played for the Altoona Mountain City and the Chicago Browns in 1884. Koons died in 1932 after being hit by a bus.

References

External links

1862 births
1932 deaths
Major League Baseball third basemen
Altoona Mountain Citys players
Chicago Browns/Pittsburgh Stogies players
19th-century baseball players
Baseball players from Philadelphia
Manchester Farmers players
Harrisburg Ponies players
Reading Actives players
Johnstown Pirates players
Road incident deaths in New Jersey
Pedestrian road incident deaths